Wyandotte Public Schools is a school district based in and serving Wyandotte, Michigan.

Schools
There is one High School and one Middle School but there are multiple Elementary Schools
Garfield Elementary School
Monroe Elementary School
The Lincoln Center-Previously William H. Taft Elementary School
McKinley Elementary School-McKinley closed at the end of the 2008–2009 school year. 
Washington Elementary School-Washington is celebrating 80 years of educating children in 2010. Washington was named the best public school in the district. 
Jefferson Elementary School
Wilson Middle School
Roosevelt High School

Wyandotte's public high school is Theodore Roosevelt High School.

External links
 Wyandotte Public Schools

Education in Wayne County, Michigan
School districts in Michigan
Wyandotte, Michigan